An incomplete list of notable druids and neo-druids:

Historical druids
The only historical druid known by name is Diviciacus of the Aedui (fl. 1st century BC)

Legendary druids
 Amergin Glúingel
 Bodhmall—female druid in the Fenian cycle
 Cathbad—Ulster cycle
 Gwenc'hlan—6th century Breton
 Merlin—from the Arthurian legends 
 Mug Ruith—blind druid in Irish mythology
 Tadg mac Nuadat—Fenian cycle
 Tlachtga—daughter of Mug Ruith
 Bé Chuille—One of the Tuatha Dé Danann in Irish mythology featured in a tale from the Metrical Dindshenchas
 Biróg—A druidess of the Tuatha Dé Danann in Irish mythology

Modern druids or neo-druids 
 Erwen Berthou (Breton, 1861-1933), French and Breton language poet, writer and neo-Druidic bard
 Gwilherm Berthou (Breton, 1908-1951), Breton nationalist and neo-Druidic bardic poet
 Steve Blamires (Scotland, b. 1955), researcher and historian in the fields of neopaganism, Celtic spirituality and folklore
 Isaac Bonewits (US, 1949-2010)
 Philip Carr-Gomm (British)
 Ossian D'Ambrosio (Italian, born 1970), musician, founder of the Cerchio Druidico Italiano
 Robert Lee "Skip" Ellison  (US)
 Jean Le Fustec Breton Grand Druid from 1900 to 1903.
 John Michael Greer (US, Grand Archdruid, AODA)
 Godfrey Higgins (British, born 1772)
 Ellen Evert Hopman (US)
 Per Vari Kerloc'h Breton Grand Druid from 2008
 Paul Ladmirault (Breton)
 Nicholas R. Mann (British)
 Morvan Marchal (Breton)
 Gerald Massey (English, 1828-1907)
 Iolo Morganwg (Welsh, 1747-1826), antiquarian, poet and collector
 Brendan Myers (Canadian, b. 1974), philosopher and author
 Ross Nichols (British, 1902-1975), Cambridge academic and published poet, artist and historian
 Xoán Paredes (b. 1975), geographer, teacher and Galician Arch-Druid from 2011
 William Price (Welsh, 1800-1893), Welsh doctor known for his support of Welsh nationalism and Chartism
 Emma Restall Orr (British, b. 1965), animist, poet and author
 Gwenc'hlan Le Scouëzec (1929-2008), Breton writer, Breton Grand Druid from 1981 to 2008.
 François Taldir-Jaffrennou (1879-1956), Breton Grand Druid from 1933 to 1955, Breton language writer and editor, one of the pioneers of the Breton autonomist movement.

Fictional druids 
 Getafix, a Gaulish druid appearing in the French comic series The Adventures of Asterix . Original French name is Panoramix.
 Merlin, a wizard who appears in Arthurian legend and is presented as a druid in some modern works, including The Warlord Chronicles series of books by Bernard Cornwell and the 2004 film King Arthur.
 Taliesin, a powerful druid and the penultimate "Merlin" of Britain in the Mists of Avalon novel by Marion Zimmer Bradley
 Allanon, one of the main protagonists in the Shannara series by author Terry Brooks.
 Pikel Bouldershoulder, in the novels of The Cleric Quintet series by R.A. Salvatore.
 Amergin, bard in the novel Bard, by Morgan Llywelyn, and his brother Colptha, a diviner.
 Atticus O'Sullivan, real name Siodhachan O Suileabhain, last of the Druids in The Iron Druid Chronicles series.
 Kevin, druid, harpist and last "Merlin" of Britain, in the Mists of Avalon novel by Marion Zimmer Bradley
 Iseldir, Druid chieftain and temporary guardian of the Cup of Life in the BBC series Merlin
 Keyleth, the druid portrayed by Marisha Ray in the long-running web series Critical Role

See also
 Neopagans
 List of pagans

Modern paganism-related lists